Deutschheim State Historic Site is a state-owned property located in Hermann, Missouri, United States, preserving historic houses and other structures, such as a barn and winery, built and used by German immigrants in the middle 19th century. The architecture covers a range of contemporary styles brought from Germany and interpreted in the United States, and the houses have furnishings reflective of mid-century German families in Missouri. The site includes grapes planted in one of the original vineyards and the site of a printing press. The buildings include exhibits of tools and artifacts of the period, giving a picture of daily life. Tours of the grounds are offered for the public. The site was acquired by the state in 1978 and is managed by the Missouri Department of Natural Resources.

References

External links
Deutschheim State Historic Site Missouri Department of Natural Resources 

Missouri State Historic Sites
Protected areas established in 1978
Open-air museums in Missouri
Ethnic museums in Missouri
German-American history
German-American culture in Missouri
Museums in Gasconade County, Missouri
Protected areas of Gasconade County, Missouri
German-American museums